Finn-Erik Vinje (born 6 March 1936) is a Norwegian philologist. He was a professor at the University of Trondheim from 1971 to 1975, and at the University of Oslo from 1975 to 2006. He was a language consultant for the Norwegian Broadcasting Corporation from 1971 to 1992. He has written several books on language-related questions.

References

1936 births
Living people
Norwegian philologists
Academic staff of the Norwegian University of Science and Technology
Academic staff of the University of Oslo
NRK people
Members of the Norwegian Academy